Morro dos Prazeres - "Hill of Pleasures" - is a favela in the Southern Zone, the Zona Sul of the Brazilian metropolis Rio de Janeiro. It is part of the quarter Santa Teresa, which is roughly 2.5 km northeast, and although considered pacified, has recently been the site of murders by gunshot of two tourists who inadvertently wandered into the community. "" Settlement of the Morro dos Prazeres began in 1940 and the census of 2010 suggested a population of 2136 people. The mountain, respectively hill, the favela is named after has an altitude of 275 metres.

The  name is a tribute to Mother Maria dos Prazeres, who held  masses on the base  of the hill, an area where once was a chapel. These days there is an apartment block.

Morro dos Prazeres is part of the statistical unit Escondidinho / Prazeres.

The favela has found wider attention as a location of the 2008 movie Elite Squad (Tropa de Elite) and as venue of Rockgol, a football event starring musicians staged by MTV, in 2011.

References

External links
 Morro dos Prazeres, illustrated Facebook page.

Favelas
Geography of Rio de Janeiro (city)